The 2005–06 Canada men's national ice hockey team represented Canada at the 2006 Winter Olympics held in Turin, Italy. The ice hockey matches were played in Torino, Italy.

Team Canada, coached by Pat Quinn, placed seventh in the Olympic tournament. It was the lowest position that a Canadian men's Olympic ice hockey team had ever achieved.

2006 Winter Olympics roster
Head coach: Pat Quinn

See also
 Canada men's national ice hockey team
 Ice hockey at the 2006 Winter Olympics
 Ice hockey at the Olympic Games
 List of Canadian national ice hockey team rosters

References

 
Canada men's national ice hockey team seasons